Dolgo Brdo is a small settlement in the hills east of Ljubljana in central Slovenia. It is included in the Ljubljana Urban Municipality. It lies in the traditional region of Lower Carniola and is now part of the Central Slovenia Statistical Region.

A small chapel in the settlement dates to the early 20th century.

References

External links

Dolgo Brdo on Geopedia

Populated places in the City Municipality of Ljubljana
Sostro District